Portuguese may refer to:
 anything of, from, or related to the country and nation of Portugal
 Portuguese cuisine, traditional foods
 Portuguese language, a Romance language
 Portuguese dialects, variants of the Portuguese language
 Portuguese man o' war, a dangerous marine animal
 Portuguese people, an ethnic group

See also 
 
 Sonnets from the Portuguese
 "A Portuguesa", the national anthem of Portugal
 Lusofonia
 Lusitania
 

Language and nationality disambiguation pages